Jalalpur Sharif is a small town located in Jhelum, and is a Union Council of Pind Dadan Khan Tehsil in Jhelum District, Punjab province, Pakistan. It is located at 32°39'34N  73°24'19E, making it approximately 50 km south west of the city of Jhelum. It is well known for The Alexender's Monument & one big Shrine.

History 

Jalalpur modern name came from the renaming of its ancient name, by Malik Darwesh Khan Janjua who was a high-ranking general of the Imperial Mughal Army under Emperor Jalaluddin Muhammad Akbar’s reign.  

It is stated that Malik Darwesh ordered the renaming of Girjak (part of his extended kingdom) to Jalalpur, when Emperor Akbar visited him. This was done in honour of the Emperor and the Janjua family's relationship. Jalalpur at this point was a flourishing centre of trade for the region.

The history of the region dates back to 326 BC when Alexander the Great and his troops camped at Jalalpur Sharif, located on the right bank of the Jhelum River (known as the Hydaspes by the Greeks), prior to the historic Battle of the Hydaspes. During this battle, Alexander’s horse Bucephalus was killed but his remains were brought back and buried close to Jalalpur Sharif where subsequently Alexander built a city named after his horse. The ruins of an ancient city are spread across the hills towards the east of Jalalpur Sharif.

A notable landmark of the town is the Shrine of Pir Syed Ghulam Haidar Ali Shah, a prominent (Chishti) leader of the Punjab, Pakistan,
(d. 1908). It is this association with the shrine of one of the most well known Chishti spiritual leaders of the sub continent that the title of Sharif is pronounced together with Jalalpur. Pir Syed Ghulam Haidar Ali Shah and his descendants, notably including his grandson, who was given the title Amir-e-Hizbullah, Pir Syed Muhammad Fazal Shah were extremely influential in the spiritual development of the Muslims of Punjab, and also in the political movement that eventually led to the creation of the Islamic Republic of Pakistan. 

The Khewra Salt Mines, the world's second largest salt mine, is located 37 km west of Jalalpur Sharif in Khewra.

Administration 

Jalalpur Sharif has one police station, and there are three higher secondary and high schools they are: 
 Govt. Higher Secondary School & college Jalalpur sharif
Govt. Degree college for women jalalpur sharif
 Govt. High School for Girls Jalalpur sharif
 Govt. Primary school jalalpur sharif
 Govt. Primary school for boys jalal pur sharif
 Govt. primary school for girls jalalpur sharif

Senior principal in jalalpur sharif is Sir Saeed Ahmad Gondal
 Al Suffah Model Elementary School Jalal pur sharif

Principal Sir Qari Muhammad Bashir Sahb

References

External links
 Wikimapia map
 Chishti Photos
 Greek Connections
 History of Jalalpur Sharif
 Local Photos
 More Local Photos

Populated places in Tehsil Pind Dadan Khan
Union councils of Pind Dadan Khan Tehsil